Java Head is a 1923 American silent romantic drama film directed by George Melford and starring Leatrice Joy, Jacqueline Logan, Frederick Strong, Alan Roscoe, and Betty Bronson in a bit part. It is based on a popular novel of the same name by Joseph Hergesheimer, which in turn is named after the geographical feature.

Java Head was remade in a 1934 British sound film starring Anna May Wong which was released by Associated Talking Pictures.

Plot
As described in a film magazine, during the late 1840s wealthy retired sea captain Jeremy Ammidon (Strong) lives with his children and grandchildren in a house known as "Java Head" in Salem, Massachusetts. Jeremy's son William (Hall) manages the family business. Gerrit Ammidon (Roscoe), skipper of the Nautilus in its oriental trade, loves Nettie Vollar (Logan), a granddaughter of Barzil Dunsack (Fawcett), an enemy of Jeremy. Barzil orders Gerrit out of his house. In China, Gerrit rescues Taou Yuen (Joy) from a gang of ruffians. Her father, a Manchu noble, orders the two to be wed or slain. Gerrit marries Taou and brings her to Salem where her appearance causes consternation among the Ammidon family and Nettie to become ill. Edward Dunsack (Hatton), a drug addict, is fascinated by Taou and tries to turn her mind against Gerrit. Edward tells her that Gerrit loves Nettie, whom she has seen at a party, but Taou repulses him. Nettie learns that Gerrit still loves her and is visited by Taou, who then takes an overdose of opium and dies. Nettie and Gerrit are wed and sail away on the Nautilus.

Cast
Leatrice Joy as Taou Yuen
Jacqueline Logan as Nettie Vollar
Frederick Strong as Jeremy Ammidon
Alan Roscoe as Gerrit Ammidon (probably credited as Albert Roscoe)
Arthur Stuart Hall as William Ammidon
Rose Tapley as Rhoda Ammidon
Violet Axzelle as Laurel Ammidon
Audrey Berry as Sisall Ammidon
Polly Archer as Camilla Ammidon
Betty Bronson as Janet Ammidon
George Fawcett as Barzil Dunsack
Raymond Hatton as Edward Dunsack
Helen Lindroth as Kate Vollar
Dan Pennell as Broadrick
George S. Stevens as The Butler
Mimi Sherwood as The Maid
Frances Hatton as The Nurse

Production notes
Exterior scenes were shot on location in Salem, Massachusetts, where the film is also set.

Preservation
No copies of Java Head are listed in any film archives, which suggests that it is a lost film.

Gallery

References

External links

Lobby poster
Foreign release poster

1923 films
1923 romantic drama films
American romantic drama films
American silent feature films
American black-and-white films
Famous Players-Lasky films
Films based on romance novels
Films set in Massachusetts
Films shot in New York City
Films shot in Massachusetts
Paramount Pictures films
Films based on American novels
Films directed by George Melford
1920s American films
Silent romantic drama films
Silent American drama films